Chaz Lamar Shepherd is an American actor and singer-songwriter. Best known as Artis Tower in Me and the Boys (1994-1995), John Hamilton on 7th Heaven (1996-2001), and Piranha in Luke Cage (2018).

Early life
Shepherd grew up in Philadelphia, Pennsylvania, where he was active in Tindley Temple United Methodist Church and graduated from Evelyn Graves Christian Academy. His mother, Cheryl Shepherd, is a dancer and choreographer who left her work in Philadelphia's public schools to manage his career. He first appeared on stage when he was 5 years old as an MC at a recital for his mother's dance school.

Career
Shepherd's professional debut came in a production of Fame staged by the Walnut Street Theatre. On television, he portrayed Al Bryant in the NBC miniseries The Temptations (1998).he also played on the Parkers. He also played Artis Tower, son of Steve Tower (Steve Harvey) on Me and the Boys and appeared on In the House, Moesha, and Sister, Sister. He played John Hamilton on 7th Heaven, had a recurring role as Trey Wiggs on The Game, and portrayed Raymond "Piranha" Jones in the second season of Luke Cage.

Shepherd appeared on film in Set It Off in the role of Stevie, On Broadway, he portrayed Billy Flynn in Chicago (2018) and Harpo in The Color Purple (2005). His other work on stage includes appearing as Curtis Taylor, Jr. in a 2009–10 national tour of the musical Dreamgirls.

Filmography

Discography

AlbumsLove & Truth''
Released: October 26, 2010
Label: Chaz Records/Introspect Music
Formats: CD, Digital Download

References

External links
 
 

Living people
Male actors from Philadelphia
African-American male actors
African-American male singer-songwriters
American male child actors
American male film actors
American male stage actors
American male television actors
Singer-songwriters from Pennsylvania
20th-century African-American male singers
21st-century African-American male singers
Year of birth missing (living people)